The 1982 Critérium du Dauphiné Libéré was the 34th edition of the cycle race and was held from 31 May to 7 June 1982. The race started in Avignon and finished in Annecy. The race was won by Michel Laurent of the Peugeot-Shell-Michelin team.

Teams
Eleven teams, containing a total of 99 riders, participated in the race:

 
 
 
 
 
 
 
 
 
 
 Fangio

Route

General classification

References

Further reading

1982
1982 in French sport
May 1982 sports events in Europe
June 1982 sports events in Europe
1982 Super Prestige Pernod